Austrasia was a territory which formed the north-eastern section of the Kingdom of the Franks from the 6th to 8th centuries, ruled by the Frankish Merovingian and Carolingian dynasties during the Early Middle Ages. It was centred on the Meuse, Middle Rhine, and the Moselle rivers, and was the original territory of the Franks, including both the so-called Salians and Rhineland Franks, which Clovis I, King of the Franks (481–511) conquered after first taking control of the bordering part of Roman Gaul (present-day northwestern France), which is sometimes described in this period as Neustria.

In 561, Austrasia became a separate kingdom within the Frankish kingdom and was ruled by the Merovingian king Sigebert I (561–575). In the 7th and 8th centuries it was the powerbase from which the Carolingians, originally mayors of the palace of Austrasia, took over the rule of all Franks, all of Gaul, most of Germany, and northern Italy. After this period of unification, the now larger Frankish Empire was once again divided between eastern, central, and western sub-kingdoms (West Francia, Middle Francia, and East Francia), with the new version of the eastern kingdom eventually becoming the foundation of the Kingdom of Germany.

Etymology
The name Austrasia is not well attested in the Merovingian period. It is recorded first by Gregory of Tours in  580 and then by Aimoin of Fleury in c. 1000.
It is presumably the latinization of an Old Frankish name, reconstructed as *Oster-rike ("Eastern Kingdom").
As with the name Austria, it contains the word for "east", i.e. meaning "eastern land" to designate the original territory of the Franks in contrast to Neustria, the "(new) western land" in northern Gaul conquered by Clovis I in the wake of the Battle of Soissons of 486.

Geography
Austrasia was centered on the Middle Rhine, including the basins of the Moselle, Main, and Meuse rivers. It bordered on Frisia and Saxony to the north, Thuringia to the east, Swabia and Burgundy to the south and to Neustria to the southwest. The exact boundary between Merovingian Neustria and Austrasia is unclear with respect to areas such as the medieval counties of Flanders, Brabant and Hainaut, and areas immediately to the south of these.

Metz served as the Austrasian capital, although some Austrasian kings ruled from Reims, Trier and Cologne. Other important cities included Verdun, Worms and Speyer. Fulda monastery was founded in eastern Austrasia in the final decade of the Merovingian period.

In the High Middle Ages, its territory became divided among the duchies of Lotharingia and Franconia in Germany, with some western portions including Reims and Rethel passing to France.

Its exact boundaries were somewhat fluid over the history of the Frankish sub-kingdoms, but Austrasia can be taken to correspond roughly to the territory of present-day Luxembourg, parts of eastern Belgium, north-eastern France (Lorraine and Champagne-Ardenne), west-central Germany (the Rhineland, Hesse and Franconia) and the southern Netherlands (Limburg, North Brabant, with a salient north of the Rhine including Utrecht and parts of Gelderland).

History 

After the death of the Frankish king Clovis I in 511, his four sons partitioned his kingdom amongst themselves, with Theuderic I receiving the lands that were to become Austrasia. Descended from Theuderic, a line of kings ruled Austrasia until 555, when it was united with the other Frankish kingdoms of Chlothar I, who inherited all the Frankish realms by 558. He redivided the Frankish territory amongst his four sons, but the four kingdoms coalesced into three on the death of Charibert I in 567: Austrasia under Sigebert I, Neustria under Chilperic I, and Burgundy under Guntram. These three kingdoms defined the political division of Francia until the rise of the Carolingians and even thereafter.

From 567 to the death of Sigebert II in 613, Neustria and Austrasia fought each other almost constantly, with Burgundy playing the peacemaker between them. These struggles reached their climax in the wars between Brunhilda and Fredegund, queens respectively of Austrasia and Neustria. Finally, in 613, a rebellion by the nobility against Brunhilda saw her betrayed and handed over to her nephew and foe in Neustria, Chlothar II. Chlothar then took control of the other two kingdoms and set up a united Frankish kingdom with its capital in Paris. During this period the first majores domus or mayors of the palace appeared. These officials acted as mediators between king and people in each realm. The first Austrasian mayors came from the Pippinid family, which experienced a slow but steady ascent until it eventually displaced the Merovingians on the throne.

In 623, the Austrasians asked Chlothar II for a king of their own and he appointed his son Dagobert I to rule over them with Pepin of Landen as regent. Dagobert's government in Austrasia was widely admired. In 629, he inherited Neustria and Burgundy. Austrasia was again neglected until, in 633, the people demanded the king's son as their own king again. Dagobert complied and sent his elder son Sigebert III to Austrasia. Historians often categorise Sigebert as the first roi fainéant, or do-nothing king, of the Merovingian dynasty. His court was dominated by the mayors. In 657, the mayor Grimoald the Elder succeeded in putting his son Childebert the Adopted on the throne, where he remained until 662. Thereafter, Austrasia was predominantly the kingdom of the Arnulfing mayors of the palace and their base of power. With the Battle of Tertry in 687, Pepin of Heristal defeated the Neustrian king Theuderic III and established his mayoralty over all the Frankish kingdoms. This was even regarded by contemporaries as the beginning of his "reign". It also signalled the dominance of Austrasia over Neustria, which would last until the end of the Merovingian era.

In 718, Charles Martel had Austrasian support in his war against Neustria for control of all the Francian realms. He was not king himself, but appointed Chlothar IV to rule in Austrasia. In 719, Francia was united by Martel's family, the Carolingian dynasty, under Austrasian hegemony. While the Frankish kings continued to divide up the Frankish realm in different ways over subsequent generations, the term Austrasia was only used occasionally after the Carolingian dynasty.

Rulers

Merovingian kings

Mayors of the palace

See also
Francia
East Francia
Duchy of Franconia
Benelux
Continental Europe

References

Bibliography 
 Charles Oman. The Dark Ages 476–918. London: Rivingtons, 1914.
 Thomas Hodgkin. Italy and Her Invaders. Oxford: Clarendon Press, 1895.

Merovingian period
Former countries in Europe
751 disestablishments
510s establishments
8th-century disestablishments in Europe
6th-century establishments in Europe